Ben Chaplin (born Benedict John Greenwood; 31 July 1969) is a British actor. He is best known for his roles in films, including The Truth About Cats & Dogs, Washington Square, The Thin Red Line, Birthday Girl, Murder by Numbers, Stage Beauty, The New World, The Water Horse: Legend of the Deep, Dorian Gray, Cinderella, Snowden, The Legend of Tarzan, and The Dig. His TV roles include Game On, Mad Dogs and The Nevers.

Early life
Chaplin was born on 31 July 1969 in Windsor, in the county of Berkshire, England, the son of Cynthia (née Chaplin), a teacher, and Peter Greenwood CBE, a civil engineer. He has one sister, Rachel, and one brother, Justin.

Chaplin became interested in acting as a teenager, after acting in a theatrical production in his school years at the Princess Margaret Royal Free School. At the age of seventeen, he enrolled at the Guildhall School of Music and Drama in London. He pursued his early acting career between odd jobs as an office worker, and for a while was employed as a statistician with the London Transport Authority.

Career
Taking his stage name from his mother's maiden name, Chaplin began his professional career performing in BBC television dramas in bit parts, and occasional cinema films. In 1992, he appeared in his first major role, starring alongside Jason Flemyng in Bye Bye Baby for Channel Four. James Ivory and Ismail Merchant cast him as a servant in The Remains of the Day; also in 1992, he appeared in Between the Lines (series 1, episode 1), and as the socially inept Con Wainwright in Feast of July (1995). Chaplin received good reviews as Tom Wingfield in Sam Mendes' stage production of The Glass Menagerie and was nominated for an Olivier award (1995) in London, and played the lead role of Matthew in the first series of the British sitcom Game On (BBC Two, 1995), and left after one series. Neil Stuke played the same role for the final two series.

In the United States, he was cast by director Michael Lehmann as a photographer caught between two women (Uma Thurman and Janeane Garofalo) in the romantic comedy The Truth About Cats & Dogs (1996), a retelling of Cyrano de Bergerac. He next played fortune-hunting Morris Townsend in a retelling of Washington Square (1997), co-starring Jennifer Jason Leigh. The film received positive reviews, but was a box office failure. Chaplin next played Private Bell in Terrence Malick's remake of The Thin Red Line (1998). Meanwhile, after numerous delays, the apocalyptical horror film Lost Souls (2000), which was filmed in 1998, was finally released.

He appeared as a low-level bank clerk who purchases a Russian mail-order bride (Nicole Kidman) in Birthday Girl (2001). He next played opposite Sandra Bullock as her relatively inexperienced partner in an investigation into a series of killings in Murder by Numbers (2002). After co-starring opposite Michelle Yeoh in the Taiwan-made action film The Touch (2002), Chaplin played George Villiers, 2nd Duke of Buckingham in the romantic drama, Stage Beauty (2004), set in the world of British theatre in the 1660s. Chaplin next had a supporting role in Chromophobia (2005), a dark thriller about a bourgeois family coming apart at the seams, also starring Penélope Cruz, Ralph Fiennes and Ian Holm. He had a small role in The New World (2005), Terrence Malick's film about the affair between Pocahontas (Q'Orianka Kilcher) and Captain John Smith (Colin Farrell). In the comedic drama Two Weeks (2006), Chaplin was one of four siblings who return home to say goodbye to their ailing mother (Sally Field). Following a supporting role in the children's fantasy The Water Horse: Legend of the Deep (2007), Chaplin portrayed prominent English stage and film actor George Coulouris in Me and Orson Welles (2009), directed by indie filmmaker Richard Linklater. He also appeared in the television miniseries World Without End (2012), where he portrayed Thomas Langley, adapted from the novel of the same name by Welsh author Ken Follett.

He received an Olivier Award nomination for Best Supporting Performer in The Glass Menagerie, and a Tony Award nomination for Best Featured Actor in The Retreat from Moscow. Recent theatre appearances include This Is How It Goes at the Donmar Warehouse in 2005, The Reporter at the National Theatre in 2007, and Farewell to the Theatre at the Hampstead Theatre in 2012. He appeared in Dates on Channel 4 in 2013, and recent film roles include the role of Cinderella's father in Cinderella (2015). He starred in Apple Tree Yard with Emily Watson in 2017.

In 2017, he appeared in the premiere production of Consent at the Royal National Theatre, London. Chaplin starred in the Joe Penhall play Mood Music at The Old Vic Theatre. He starred in The Children Act (2017), adapted from the Ian McEwan novel of the same name. He starred in the BBC series Press with Charlotte Riley, as unethical tabloid editor Duncan Allen, a role which won him a number of positive reviews.

Filmography

References

External links
 
 

1969 births
Male actors from London
Alumni of the Guildhall School of Music and Drama
English male film actors
English male stage actors
English male television actors
Living people
People educated at Hurtwood House
Male actors from Berkshire
People from Windsor, Berkshire
20th-century English male actors
21st-century English male actors